The 2018 season is Ratchaburi Mitr Phol Football Club's 12th existence. It is the 3rd season in the Thai League and the club's 6th consecutive season in the top flight of the Thai football league system since promoted in the 2013 season.

League by seasons

Competitions

Thai League

Thai FA Cup

Thai League Cup

References

External links
 Thai League official website
 Club's official Facebook page
 Club's info from Thai League official website

Ratchaburi Mitr Phol F.C. seasons
Association football in Thailand lists
RBM